Beauty Parlor (Movie) is a 1932 American pre-Code drama film directed by Richard Thorpe and starring Barbara Kent, Joyce Compton and John Harron.

Cast
 Barbara Kent as Sally Dale  
 Joyce Compton as Joan Perry  
 John Harron as Jeffery Colt 
 Dorothy Revier as Stella Fremont  
 Albert Gran as Burke 
 Wheeler Oakman as Fremont  
 Mischa Auer as Herman Bauer  
 Betty Mack as Lou  
 Harry C. Bradley as Henry Mason

References

Bibliography
 Pitts, Michael R. Poverty Row Studios, 1929-1940. McFarland & Company, 2005.

External links
 

1932 films
1932 drama films
1930s English-language films
American drama films
Films directed by Richard Thorpe
American black-and-white films
Chesterfield Pictures films
1930s American films